The Voice is an American singing reality competition television series broadcast on NBC. It premiered during the spring television cycle on April 26, 2011. Based on the original The Voice of Holland and part of The Voice franchise, it has aired twenty-two seasons and aims to find unsigned singing talent (solo or duets, professional and amateur) contested by aspiring singers, age 13 or over, drawn from public auditions.

The winner is determined by television viewers voting by telephone, internet, SMS text, and iTunes Store purchases of the audio-recorded artists' vocal performances. They receive US$100,000 and a record deal with Universal Music Group for winning the competition. The winners of the twenty-two seasons have been: Javier Colon, Jermaine Paul, Cassadee Pope, Danielle Bradbery, Tessanne Chin, Josh Kaufman, Craig Wayne Boyd, Sawyer Fredericks, Jordan Smith, Alisan Porter, Sundance Head, Chris Blue, Chloe Kohanski, Brynn Cartelli, Chevel Shepherd, Maelyn Jarmon, Jake Hoot, Todd Tilghman, Carter Rubin, Cam Anthony, Girl Named Tom, and Bryce Leatherwood.

The series employs a panel of four coaches who critique the artists' performances and guide their teams of selected artists through the remainder of the season. They also compete to ensure that their act wins the competition, thus making them the winning coach. The original panel featured Christina Aguilera, CeeLo Green, Adam Levine, and Blake Shelton; the panel for the current twenty-third season features Shelton, Kelly Clarkson, Niall Horan, and Chance the Rapper. Other coaches from previous seasons include Shakira, Usher, Gwen Stefani, Pharrell Williams, Miley Cyrus, Alicia Keys, Jennifer Hudson, John Legend, Nick Jonas, Ariana Grande, and Camila Cabello. In the fifteenth season, Kelsea Ballerini was featured as an off-screen fifth coach for "Comeback Stage" contestants. Bebe Rexha took over as the "Comeback Stage" coach for the sixteenth season.

Concept
An adaptation of the Dutch show The Voice of Holland, NBC announced the show under the name The Voice of America in December 2010; its name was soon shortened to The Voice. (The name "Voice of America" was already in use by the U.S. government for its overseas radio service.) In each season, the winner receives $100,000 and a record deal with Universal Republic Records (seasons 1 & 2) or later Universal Music Group (season 3–present).

Selection process and format

Each season begins with the "Blind Auditions", where coaches form their team of artists (12 in almost all seasons except seasons 1, 3, 18–20, 22–23) whom they mentor through the remainder of the season. The coaches' chairs are faced towards the audience during artists' performances; those interested in an artist press their button, which turns their chair towards the artist and illuminates the bottom of the chair to read "I want you." At the conclusion of the performance, an artist either defaults to the only coach who turned around or selects their coach if more than one coach expresses interest. Introduced in the 14th season is "Block", which allows one coach to block another coach from getting a contestant.

In the "Battle Rounds", each coach pairs two of their team members to perform together, then chooses one to advance in the competition. In each season, coaches are assisted by celebrity advisors that are different in each season. In the first season, coaches sit alongside their respective advisors in the battle stage. However, starting with the second season, the advisors no longer join the coaches in the battle stage. A new element was added in season three; coaches were given two "steals", allowing each coach to select two individuals who were eliminated during a battle round by another coach. Saves were also added later, which lets a coach prevent someone that they eliminated on their team from going home.

The Knockout Rounds were also introduced in season three and introduced in almost all seasons except seasons six and sixteen. A pair of artists within a team are selected to sing individual performances in succession. They are not told until a few minutes prior to their performances who their partner is. The artists get to choose their own songs in this round, although they continue to get help and advice from their respective coaches. At the conclusion of the performances, coaches would decide which one of each pair gets to advance to the next round. Similar to the battle rounds, the coaches can steal one eliminated artist from another coach starting with season five. Starting in season 14, coaches can save one eliminated artist from their own team. In season 18, the artists who were saved faced a Four-Way Knockout, with the winner decided through a public vote.

The "Battles, Round 2" were introduced to replace the Knockout Rounds in season six. Similar to the Knockout Rounds, each singer is paired within their team. One celebrity key adviser also assists all four of the coaches and their teams in preparation of these rounds. Coaches give each Battle pairing a list of songs and each pair must agree on which song to sing. Like the first Battle round, each coach can still decide which of their singers in each pair will advance to the next round, and also allowed one steal.

In the sixteenth season, the knockouts were replaced by The Live Cross Battles, a format identical to the Cross Battles from the Chinese version of The Voice. Each coach selects an artist to perform with another coach's artist together. The artist that receives the public vote will move on to the Playoffs, while the losing artist may be eliminated from the competition. The Live Cross Battles did not return in season seventeen due to poor reception.

Previously eliminated artists can also advance to compete in the live shows; between seasons nine and thirteen (except season 11), each coach saved one artist (from either the Battle or Knockout rounds) to put through to the Live Playoffs. For seasons 15, 16 and 20, selected singers (prior to the Live elimination rounds) are put through to the "Comeback Stage" (which would be mentored by a fifth coach) and competed in a series of duels for a place in the live shows, with the winner earning a right to join a team of their choice.

In the final live performance phase of the competition, artists perform in weekly shows, where public voting narrows to a final group of artists and eventually declares a winner. The coaches have the power to save one artist that had not received the public's vote that week. As of season two, these artists would give a last chance performance to win their coach's save. However, in deciding who moves on to the final four phase, the television audience and the coaches have equal say. With one team member remaining for each coach, the contestants compete against each other in the finale, where the outcome is decided solely by public vote. For the first two seasons, one artist per team would advance, but in favor on focusing on a more competitive format due to multiple potential artists, the format was revised beginning season three where artists who earned the lowest number of votes were progressively eliminated each week until five artists remain (three until season 6, then four prior to season 17), hence introducing a possibility where at least one coach would not represent a single artist in the finals, except in the case from seasons 18–20, where the rules in the semifinals was made to guarantee on having at least one artist representing the coach in the finale to accommodate the short number of live shows at three weeks, but these changes were reverted on the twenty-first season by reverting to the regular elimination format while retaining the top five finalists.

Voting system

In a first for a music competition series, NBC and Universal Republic Records offered fans of the show the ability to vote for their favorite artists by purchasing the studio versions of the songs that they perform on the live show each week via the iTunes Store. Alternative methods of voting can be done through toll-free phone calls (until season 8), text messaging, "The Voice Official App on NBC" app, and online votes via NBC.com and Facebook. Each method is limited to ten votes per user, and voting lasts until noon EST the next day.

From the top 12 results show of season 3 to the end of season 17, a rule regarding voting was enacted with regard to iTunes singles purchases. In the first two seasons, voting via iTunes purchases of contestant performances counted singly during the official voting window and only accredited to the live show in concern. When a competitor's performance peaked within the Top 10 of the iTunes "Top 200 Singles Chart" during this window, it was given an iTunes bonus that multiplies iTunes votes made by ten. In season 5, the iTunes bonus multiplier was reduced to five for the studio versions of the songs performed by the competitors. The finale's vote count included a 'Cumulative iTunes Vote Total' of all singles (from the live shows onwards) purchased during and outside of the various voting windows, with iTunes bonuses previously earned. Between seasons 15 and 17, the bonus multiplier was revised to include streams counting as a vote, and the only artist with the most streams after the voting window ended would receive the bonus. The iTunes bonus multiplier was discontinued beginning with the live shows of the eighteenth season, as the performances are now recorded away from the studios and could not be recorded to iTunes or Spotify; this measure was initially enacted for safety reasons as a result of the COVID-19 outbreak. In the nineteenth season, studio performances are now recorded on YouTube Music, replacing the traditional iTunes and Spotify recordings that were done between the seasons 2–17, but this was changed back beginning season 20, though bonuses do not apply regardless if the song charted within the top 10 or not.

Only the studio recording of the contestants' performances, not the live performance, were available on iTunes. In the first season, the battle rounds were recorded in the studio with both artists in the pairing. However, from season 2 to season 18, only the winner's version of the song from the battle round was released. Season 7 reverted to the old style of both artists. With the introduction of the Knockout Rounds in season three, where each contestant sang a separate song, only the winner's single was released.

The "Instant Save" was introduced in season five. During the live elimination episodes, viewers are given a five-minute window to vote for the contestants at risk of elimination by using their Twitter account (and since season 17, the official app) to decide which contestant will move on to the next show, starting with the Top 13. Home viewers can only vote once per account for one contestant of their choice. Since season six, the instant saves now function as a last-chance performance where artists perform an additional song to rally votes.

Coaches and hosts

Coaches
CeeLo Green of Gnarls Barkley and Adam Levine of Maroon 5 became the first confirmed coaches in February 2011, followed by Christina Aguilera and Blake Shelton in March. Aguilera and Green did not return for season four and were replaced by Shakira and Usher. Aguilera and Green then returned for season five, while Shakira and Usher returned for season six. In an interview with Ellen DeGeneres in February 2014, Green revealed that he would not be returning to The Voice. On March 31, 2014, it was announced that Pharrell Williams would become Green's replacement. On April 19, 2014, it was announced that No Doubt's Gwen Stefani would replace Aguilera in season seven due to her pregnancy. On May 20, 2014, Shakira and Usher confirmed that after season six, they would focus on their music. On March 25, 2016, Miley Cyrus confirmed that following her role as key advisor during the tenth season that she would be joining the series once again in its eleventh season as a coach. That same day, Alicia Keys was also announced to be joining the series as a coach for the eleventh season. On October 18, 2016, it was announced that Stefani would re-join the coaches' panel for the series' twelfth season, alongside returning coaches Keys, Levine and Shelton; it was also confirmed that Cyrus would return for the thirteenth season.

On April 27, 2017, in an interview published by TV Insider, Keys confirmed that the twelfth season would be her last. She stated, "Who knows what the future holds, but I know this one is my final season." On May 10, 2017, NBC announced that Jennifer Hudson would join the coaches lineup for the series' thirteenth season alongside Cyrus, Levine and Shelton. On May 11, 2017, it was announced that Kelly Clarkson would be a coach in season fourteen in 2018. On October 18, 2017, NBC announced that Alicia Keys would return to the series for the 14th season. On May 10, 2018, it was announced that Hudson would return for the series' fifteenth season after a one-season hiatus joining Clarkson, Levine, and Shelton. Kelsea Ballerini also joined season fifteen as the fifth coach for the Comeback Stage of the competition. On September 13, 2018, John Legend was announced as a coach for the show's sixteenth season, alongside returning coaches Clarkson, Levine and Shelton.

On February 25, 2019, it was announced that Bebe Rexha will be the fifth coach for season 16 Comeback Stage. In May 2019, it was announced that all four coaches from the same sixteenth season would return for the series' seventeenth season. Later that month, it was announced that Levine would exit the series; Stefani was announced to be returning to the coaching panel as his successor. In October 2019, it was announced that Nick Jonas would join the show as a coach for its eighteenth season, alongside returning coaches Shelton, Clarkson and Legend. In June 2020, it was announced that Stefani would be returning to the coaching panel, replacing Jonas, for the nineteenth season, alongside returning coaches Shelton, Clarkson and Legend. In November of the same year, it was announced Stefani would again depart the coaching panel ahead of its twentieth season, and would be replaced by returning Jonas. In March 2021, it was announced that Ariana Grande would replace Jonas for season twenty-one alongside returning coaches Clarkson, Legend and Shelton. In May 2022, it was announced that Stefani would be returning to the coaching panel for season twenty-two alongside returning coaches Legend and Shelton. It was later confirmed that Clarkson would also not be returning to the series in 2022, while Camila Cabello would enter the coaching panel as a new coach. On October 11, 2022, it was confirmed that Shelton and Clarkson would be returning for season 23, along with new coaches Chance the Rapper and Niall Horan. It was also announced that Shelton will leave the show after season 23.

Coaches gallery

Timeline of coaches

Hosts
Carson Daly has hosted the series since the inaugural season. Alison Haislip served as the original "backstage, online and social media correspondent" and was replaced by Christina Milian. Milian did not return for season five, at which point Daly assumed the duties as the social media correspondent.

Coaches' advisors
Battle round advisors are listed first; additional advisors and their roles are denoted by superscripts.

Coaches' teams

These are each of the coaches teams throughout the seasons from the playoffs, to the finale.

Series overview
Warning: the following table presents a significant amount of different colors.

Reception
In 2016, a New York Times study of the 50 TV shows with the most Facebook Likes found that The Voice "is most popular in North Dakota and least popular in New York. It was behind only Duck Dynasty and Fast N' Loud in its correlation with Trump voters".

Awards and nominations

Ratings

The first season premiered strong at 11.78 million viewers and actually grew upon that audience through its first season. In the 18–49 demographic, the show constantly found itself in the top 5. For its average season rating, the show landed itself as No. 20 with total viewers at nearly 12 million viewers. In the 18–49 rankings, the show was No. 4 at a 5.4 ranking.

The second season premiered on Super Bowl Sunday, February 5, 2012, and for a while managed to keep a 6.0 in the adults 18–49 demographic and 17 million viewers. Partnering The Voice with Smash (NBC's musical drama) helped NBC win the Monday night ratings. However, by Monday, April 9, the ratings had fallen to a 4.0 rating in the adult 18–49 demographic.

The third season premiered on Monday, September 10, 2012, to 12.28 million viewers and a 4.2 rating in the 18–49 demographic and has since then grown to a season-high 4.8 rating in the 18–49 demographic on October 8, October 15 and 29, 2012 and a 4.9 rating in the finale. The Voice, along with NBC's new drama, Revolution has once again led NBC to win every Monday night of the season so far, just like it did last season. On Tuesdays, comedies Go On and The New Normal has been successful thanks to The Voice, leading NBC to be the only network of the Big 5 to grow in ratings from last season.

The fourth season premiered on Monday, March 25, 2013, to a 13.64 million viewer audience, scoring a 4.8 in the 18–49 demographic but fell back to a 12.41 million viewer audience. In the 18–49 demographic, this first episode had a 4.1 score.

The fifth season premiered on Monday, September 23, 2013, scoring 14.98 million viewers and a 5.1 in the 18–49 demographic.

The sixth season premiered on February 24, 2014, and was watched by 15.74 million viewers with a 4.7 rating in the 18–49 demographic. It was up from last season's premiere by 0.76 million viewers.

The seventh season premiered on September 22, 2014, and was watched by 12.95 million viewers with a 3.9 rating in the 18–49 demographic. It was down from last season's premiere by 2.91 million viewers.

The eighth season premiered on February 23, 2015, and was watched by 13.97 million viewers with a 4.1 rating in the 18–49 demographic. It was up from last season's premiere by 1.02 million viewers.

The ninth season premiered on September 21, 2015, and was watched by 12.37 million viewers with a 3.5 rating in the 18–49 demographic. It was down from last fall's premiere by 0.48 million viewers.

The tenth season premiered on February 29, 2016, and was watched by 13.33 million viewers with a 3.4 rating in the 18–49 demographic. It was up from last season's premiere by 0.96 million viewers.

The eleventh season premiered on September 19, 2016, and was watched by 12.10 million viewers with a 3.3 rating in the 18–49 demographic. It is down from last season's premiere by 1.23 million viewers.

The twelfth season premiered on February 27, 2017, and was watched by 13.03 million viewers with a 3.1 in the 18–49 demographic. It was up from last season's premiere by 0.93 million viewers.

The thirteenth season premiered on September 25, 2017, and was watched by 10.57 million viewers with a 2.6 in the 18–49 demographic. It is down from last season's premiere by 2.46 million viewers.

The fourteenth season premiered on February 26, 2018, and was watched by 12.31 million viewers with a 2.8 in the 18–49 demographic. It is up from last season's premiere by 1.74 million viewers.

The fifteenth season premiered on September 24, 2018, and was watched by 9.66 million viewers with a 2.0 in the 18–49 demographic. This is the second lowest-rated season premiere to date.

The sixteenth season premiered on February 25, 2019, and was watched by 10.77 million viewers with a 2.1 in the 18–49 demographic. This was up from the previous season by 1.11 million viewers.

The seventeenth season premiered on September 23, 2019, and was watched by 8.93 million viewers with a 1.7 in the 18–49 demographic marking the lowest season premiere to date.

The eighteenth season premiered on February 24, 2020, with 8.99 million viewers with a 1.5 in the 18–49 demographic marking a new low for a season premiere.

The nineteenth season premiered on October 19, 2020, with 8.20 million viewers with a 1.2 in the 18–49 demographic marking the latest new series low.

The twentieth season premiered on March 1, 2021, with 7.89 million viewers with a 1.1 in the 18–49 demographic marking the latest new series low.

The twenty-first season premiered on September 20, 2021, with 7.22 million viewers with a 1.1 in the 18–49 demographic marking the latest news series low in viewers but steady in the demographic.

The twenty-second season premiered on September 19, 2022, with 6.12 million viewers with a 0.6 in the 18-49 demographic marking the latest series low in both demographic.

The twenty-third season premiered on March 6, 2023, with 6.44 million viewers with a 0.7 in the 18-49 demographic. This marks an increase in the viewers by .32 million viewers and .1 rating demographic.

Each U.S. network television season starts in late September and ends in late May, which coincides with the completion of May sweeps.

† Including an episode that aired after a live broadcast of the Super Bowl:
 10:19–10:30 = 46.786 million viewers (retention: 76.68% – football game itself reached a peak of 118.355 million viewers)
 10:30–10:45 = 39.494 million viewers
 10:45–11:00 = 36.310 million viewers
 11:00–11:15 = 32.630 million viewers
 11:15–11:21 = 31.792 million viewers

Video game
The Voice: I Want You is a video game based on the television show. It was released on PlayStation 3, Xbox 360, Wii, and Wii U on October 21, 2014, and was published by Activision. The game includes a microphone and has songs from the show including songs performed by the coaches.

Broadcast
The Voice is broadcast on the NBC network in the United States. The show premiered in Canada on April 26, 2011, on CTV. In Asia, the series began airing on August 21, 2011, on AXN and was transferred to Star World (now Fox Life) starting in Season 11 until cessation of transmission on October 1, 2021. It premiered in New Zealand on July 16, 2011, on TV2, in Australia on August 9, 2011, on Go!, in South Africa on October 5, 2011, on SABC 3, and on March 31, 2012, in the Philippines on Studio 23 (now S+A). On May 22, 2019, it premiered in Germany on sixx starting Season 14.

References

External links
 
 
 

 
2010s American reality television series
2011 American television series debuts
American music television series
English-language television shows
Music competitions in the United States
NBC original programming
Primetime Emmy Award for Outstanding Reality Program winners
Primetime Emmy Award-winning television series
Super Bowl lead-out shows
Television series by Warner Horizon Television
Television series by MGM Television
American live television series